Elections to Liverpool City Council were held on 1 November 1919.

One third of the council seats were up for election. The term of office for each councillor being three years.

Ten of the thirty-six seats were uncontested.

After the election, the composition of the council was:

Election result

Ward results

* - Retiring Councillor seeking re-election

Abercromby

Aigburth

Allerton, Childwall & Little Woolton

Anfield

Breckfield

Brunswick

Castle Street

Dingle

Edge Hill

Everton

Exchange

Fairfield

Fazakerley

Garston

Granby

Great George

Kensington

Kirkdale

Low Hill

Netherfield

North Scotland

Old Swan

Prince's Park

Sandhills

St. Anne's

St. Domingo

St. Peter's

Sefton Park East

Sefton Park West

South Scotland

Vauxhall

Walton

Warbreck

Wavertree

Wavertree West

West Derby

Aldermanic Elections 10 November 1919

Caused by the death on 9 September 1919 of Alderman John Duncan JP (Conservative, last elected as an alderman by the Council on 9 November 1913)

In his place, Councillor Frederick Thomas Richardson (Labour, Edge Hill, elected unopposed 1 November 1914) Postal Official of 10 Fairfield Street, Liverpool was elected by the Council as an alderman on 10 November 1919.

On 10 November 1919, Councillor William Albert Robinson (Labour, Garston, elected unopposed 1 November 1914) Trades Union Official of 13 St. Andrew Road, was elected by the Council as the first alderman for the Fazakerley ward
.

Aldermanic Election 7 July 1920

Caused by the resignation of Alderman Robert Stephen Porter
(Conservative, appointed by the Council as an alderman on 9 November 1916), which was reported to the Council on 5 May 1920

In his place, Councillor John George Moyles JP (Party?, ward?, elected?)
of 2 Bedford Road, Walton was elected, by the Council as an alderman on 7 July 1920

By-elections

No. 18 Edge Hill, 26 November 1919

Caused by the election as an alderman, by the council of Councillor Frederick Thomas Richardson (Labour, Edge Hill, elected unopposed 1 November 1914) on 10 November 1919, following the death on 9 September 1919 of Alderman John Duncan JP (Conservative, last elected as an alderman by the Council on 9 November 1913)

No. 37 Garston, 26 November 1919

Caused by the election, by the Council, as an alderman on 10 November 1919 of Councillor William Albert Robinson (Labour, Garston, elected unopposed 1 November 1914).

No. 24 Sefton Park West 

Caused by the resignation of Councillor Herbert Reynolds Rathbone
(Liberal, elected unopposed 1 November 1919) which was reported to the Council on 7 July 1920.

See also

 Liverpool City Council
 Liverpool Town Council elections 1835 - 1879
 Liverpool City Council elections 1880–present
 Mayors and Lord Mayors of Liverpool 1207 to present
 History of local government in England

References

1919
1919 English local elections
November 1919 events
1910s in Liverpool